A by-election for the Singapore City Council was held in 1958 after the resignation of Chang Yuen Tong, a member who held the seat for Kallang Constituency. While he cited his inability to reconcile the demands of his work with those of The Workers' Party of Singapore which he was a member, Lee Kuan Yew subsequently alleged that it was an orchestrated move by communist leader Fang Chuang Pi.

The Workers' Party fielded Lo Ka Fat to contest in the byelection, which was held on 26 July 1958. He was up against Lim Ser Puan of the Labour Front, Buang bin Omar Junid of the People's Action Party and Govindapillai Maruthamuthoo Kanagasabai, an independent.

Election deposit
The election deposit was stated at $250. As both candidates Lo Ka Fat and Govindapillai had failed to achieve the minimum 12.5% of the votes, both candidates lost their deposit.

Historical significance
This is the only by-election for the City Council and also the last City Council election before its abolishment in 1959 when People's Action Party took power in order to prevent it to serve as a government pressure group.

With this arrangement since then, all of its functions were incorporated into statutory boards, only to see these functions to be transferred out of civil service hands in 1991 to the town councils, which are managed by the relevant elected Member of Parliament (MP).

Results

References
 1958 City Council By election's result
 Background of 1958 City Council By Election
 Brief introduction and historical significance of City Council's elections

Singapore
City Council by-election
Singapore City Council by-election
By-elections in Singapore
Singapore City Council elections